Rydel is both a given name and surname. Notable people with this name include:

Given name
 Rydel Lynch (born 1993), American singer, musician and television actress

Surname
 Ben Rydel (born 2003 or 2004), English footballer
 Filip Rýdel (born 1984), Czech football player
 Lucjan Rydel (1870–1918), Polish playwright and poet
 Ryan Rydel (born 2001), English football player

See also
Rydell (name), given name and surname